"Glemmer dig aldrig" is a song by Danish electro, dance and house duo Svenstrup & Vendelboe, featuring vocals from Nadia Malm. It was released in Denmark as a digital download on 3 February 2012. The song peaked at number 2 on the Danish Singles Chart on its first week of release.

Track listing

Chart performance

Release history

References

2012 singles
2012 songs
Songs written by Engelina
Svenstrup & Vendelboe songs